Hrubý (feminine Hrubá) is a Czech and Slovak surname, meaning crude, rouge, gross or (in the old Czech) big. People with this surname include:

 Anna Hruby, Australian actress
 Berta Hrubá, Czech field hockey player
 Jan Hrubý, Czech rock violinist
 Jill Hruby, American engineer
 Joy Hruby, Australian actress, producer, film-maker, author and agent
 Ladislav Hrubý, Czech cross-country skier
 Michaela Hrubá, Czech high jumper
 Robert Hrubý, Czech footballer
 Tomáš Hrubý, Czech cyclist
 Vincenz Hruby, Czech chess master
 Vlastimil Hrubý, Czech footballer

The word and its derivatives are also contained in many names of places in the Czech Republic and Slovakia

Hrubá Skála, village in Semily district 
Hrubá Vrbka, village in Hodonín district  
Hrubčice, village in Prostějov district 
Hrubý Jeseník (Nymburk District), village in Nymburk district
Hrubý Jeseník, mountains on the border between Moravia and Silesia
Hrubý Rohozec, castle 
Hrubý Šúr, village in Senec district

See also
Hrubá (disambiguation)
Hruby Conservatory of Music

Czech-language surnames
Slovak-language surnames
Surnames from nicknames